John Matthew Armstrong (born 3 January 1981) is an English first-class cricketer.  Armstrong is a left-handed batsman who bowls leg break googly.  He was born at Consett, County Durham.

Armstrong represented the Lancashire Cricket Board in 2 List A matches against Oxfordshire and Scotland in the 1st and 2nd rounds of the 2003 Cheltenham & Gloucester Trophy which was held in 2002.  In his 2 List A matches, he scored 1 run at a batting average of 0.50.

References

External links
John Armstrong at Cricinfo
John Armstrong at CricketArchive

1981 births
Living people
Sportspeople from Consett
English cricketers
Lancashire Cricket Board cricketers
Cricketers from County Durham